John Creed (1819 – November 28, 1872) was an Irish born Union Army soldier during the American Civil War. He received the Medal of Honor for gallantry during the Battle of Fisher's Hill near Strasburg, Virginia fought September 21–24, 1864. The battle was one of the engagements of the Valley Campaigns of 1864.

Creed joined the 23rd Illinois Infantry in August 1862, and was discharged in June 1865.

Medal of Honor citation

See also

List of Medal of Honor recipients
List of American Civil War Medal of Honor recipients: A–F

References

External links
Military Times Hall of Valor

1819 births
1872 deaths
19th-century Irish people
Irish soldiers in the United States Army
People from County Tipperary
United States Army Medal of Honor recipients
People of Illinois in the American Civil War
Irish-born Medal of Honor recipients
American Civil War recipients of the Medal of Honor
Burials at Calvary Cemetery (Evanston, Illinois)